Palen or Palén is a surname. Notable people with the surname include:

Anna von Palen (1875–1939), German actress
Cole Palen (1925–1993), American flier & collector
Fyodor Palen (1780–1863), Russian diplomat and administrator
Paul Palén (1881–1944), Swedish shooter
Rufus Palen (1807–1844), American politician
Tim Palen, American motion picture marketing executive and award-winning photographer

See also
Palen Mountains, northern Colorado Desert, California, USA
Palen Creek Correctional Centre, about 100 km south west of Brisbane
Frank A. Palen House, historic home located at Kingston in Ulster County, New York
Frederic Palen Schoonmaker (1870–1945), United States federal judge
Palin
Pahlen